The now defunct National Collegiate Rowing Championship was a quasi-official national championship for men's collegiate rowing, held in Cincinnati, Ohio, between 1982 and 1996. It pitted the winners of the Eastern Sprints, the Pac-10s, the Intercollegiate Rowing Association, and the Harvard-Yale Boat Race against each other in a finals-only event. Other crews, if they felt they were competitive, could also compete if there was room in the field. The winners were as follows:

1996 Princeton University
 1995 Brown University
 1994 Brown University
 1993 Brown University
 1992 Harvard University
 1991 University of Pennsylvania
 1990 University of Wisconsin–Madison
 1989 Harvard University
 1988 Harvard University
 1987 Harvard University
 1986 University of Wisconsin–Madison
 1985 Harvard University
 1984 University of Washington
 1983 Harvard University
 1982 Yale University

References

College sports championships in the United States
College rowing competitions in the United States
Sports competitions in Cincinnati